Miklagard – The History of the Vikings Volume 2 is an album by German power metal band Rebellion, and the second part in their Viking trilogy. It is the first album with female guitarist Simone Wenzel. The vocals on "Vi seglar mot Miklagard" (Swedish: "We're Sailing to Miklagard") are contributed by Charles Rytkönen (Morgana Lefay).

Track listing
"Vi seglar mot Miklagard" – 1:49
"Sweden" – 4:22
"Free" – 5:04
"On the Edge of Life" – 5:59
"Ulfberth" – 4:42
"The Rus" – 4:06
"Kiew" – 4:31
"Aifur" – 4:08
"Taste of Steel" – 3:27
"God of Thunder" – 5:23
"Our Backs to the Wind" – 5:25
"Miklagard" – 4:34
"The Uprising" – 7:07

All music written by Uwe Lulis. All lyrics written by Tomi Göttlich, except tracks 1 (Charles Rytkönen), 12 (Göttlich and Michael Seifert), and 13 (Seifert).

Personnel
 Michael Seifert – vocals
 Uwe Lulis – guitars
 Simone Wenzel – guitars
 Tomi Göttlich – bass
 Gerd Lücking – drums

2007 albums
Rebellion (band) albums
Concept albums
Massacre Records albums
Sequel albums